Keele Peak, in Yukon, Canada is the highest peak in the Mackenzie Mountains at . With a prominence measure of  it is one of Canada's most prominent peaks. It is located about 25 km from the Canol Road not far from the Northwest Territories border.

The peak was named for Joseph Keele, an explorer and geologist who had moved to Canada from his native Ireland.

See also
 Mountain peaks of Canada
 Mountain peaks of North America
 Most isolated mountain peaks of Canada
 List of Ultras of North America
 List of the most prominent summits of North America

References

External links
 Site of expedition to climb the summit (2005)
 "Keele Peak, Yukon Territory" on Peakbagger

Two-thousanders of Yukon